There are eleven metropolitan regions in Germany consisting of the country's most densely populated cities and their catchment areas. They represent Germany's political, commercial and cultural centres. The eleven metropolitan regions in Germany were organised into political units for planning purposes.

Based on a narrower definition of metropolises commonly used to determine the metropolitan status of a given city, only four cities in Germany surpass the threshold of at least one million inhabitants within their administrative borders: Berlin, Hamburg, Munich, and Cologne.

For urban centres outside metropolitan areas that are a similar focal point for their region, but on a smaller scale, the concept of the Regiopolis and the related concepts of regiopolitan area or regio were introduced by urban and regional planning professors in 2006.

Metropolitan regions

Sorted alphabetically: 
Berlin Metropolitan Region
Central German Metropolitan Region 
Frankfurt/Rhine-Main Metropolitan Region
Hamburg Metropolitan Region
Hannover-Braunschweig-Göttingen-Wolfsburg Metropolitan Region
Munich Metropolitan Region
Northwest Metropolitan Region
Nuremberg Metropolitan Region
Rhine-Neckar Metropolitan Region
Rhine-Ruhr Metropolitan Region (also covers the Cologne Bonn Region)
Stuttgart Metropolitan Region

Big five
The five most important regions, collectively often called the Big Five, are frequently compared with other European metropolitan regions (EMR) in terms of investment and market development. They are (from north to south):
Hamburg, Berlin, the polycentric Ruhr-Düsseldorf-Cologne region (collectively referred to as Rhine-Ruhr), Frankfurt and Munich. The Globalization and World Cities Study Group (GaWC) considers Frankfurt and Munich as "α" (alpha) global cities, whereas the others are classified as "β" (beta) global cities.

Each of them forms types of clusters and achieves varying levels of performance in areas, including business activity, human capital, information and technology exchange, cultural experience, and political engagement.
Hamburg
Berlin
Rhine-Ruhr
Frankfurt/Rhine-Main
Munich

List

See also
Largest European metropolitan areas
Largest urban areas of the European Union
Demographics of Germany
Tourism in Germany

References

External links
Initiativkreises Europäischer Metropolregionen in Deutschland

 
Cities in Germany
Germany
Germany geography-related lists

de:Metropolregion#In Deutschland